Obokun is a Local Government Area in Osun State. Its headquarters is at Ibokun.

It has an area of 527 km. The population is 116,511 at the 2006 census and it is 144,980 on 2019.

The postal code of the area is 233.

It is known for its divergence and it mainly an Ijesha land. 97% of Ijesha people occupy the Local Government. Its largest town is Ibokun, which is the Local Government Headquarters. Other towns are Adaowode,Ipetu-Ile, Otan-Ile, Imesi-ile, Esa-Oke, Esa-Odo, Ilase, Iponda, Ikinyinwa, Idominasi and Ora and others.

Education 
Obokun Local Government is one of the most educated Local Government Area in Osun State. 65% of its population is educated above secondary level according to the state Ministry of Education (2009).

Religion 
46% of the population is Christians while 45% are Muslims. 9% of the population are traditional worshipers.

References

Local Government Areas in Osun State